Three sieges of Petra, Lazica occurred during the Lazic War between the Sasanians and the Byzantines:
Siege of Petra (541)
Siege of Petra (549)
Siege of Petra (550–551)

Lists of battles